Win the Future (WTF) was an American political organization. It was co-founded in 2017 by Reid Hoffman, Mark Pincus, and Adam Werbach following Donald Trump's election to the U.S. presidency.

Methods 
On September 25, 2017 WTF projected a 70ft wicked-witch themed image onto the Rayburn House Office Building in Washington, D.C. calling on Congress to protect the Affordable Care Act. The group chose this theme using a summer crowdsourcing campaign where they gathered ideas from their members on social media.

In 2018, the group announced a collaboration with political comedian Samantha Bee to develop a non-partisan voter turnout game called This is Not a Game: The Game.

Bee launched the game in the weeks before the 2018 U.S. midterm elections. According to Bee, the goal was "to make something that would drive voter turnout in a bipartisan way."

After launch, the app was downloaded more than 1 million times.

References 

Political organizations based in the United States